Peter B. Moore (born October 15, 1939) is Sterling Professor emeritus of Chemistry, Professor of Molecular Biophysics and Biochemistry at Yale University. He has dedicated his entire career to understanding the structure, function, and mechanism of the ribosome.

Moore was born in Boston, Massachusetts, in 1939 to Laura Bartlett Moore and Francis Daniels Moore. He received his B.S. degree in biophysics from Yale University in 1961, and his Ph.D. in biophysics from Harvard University in 1966, where he worked in the laboratory of James D. Watson. Prior to attending Yale, Moore graduated from Milton Academy, a prestigious college preparatory school in Milton, Massachusetts, where he was elected to the Cum Laude Society. As a postdoctoral fellow and a sabbatical visitor, he has done research at the University of Geneva, Switzerland (with A. Tissieres), at the Medical Research Council Laboratory of Molecular Biology, Cambridge, England (with Hugh E. Huxley), and at the University of Oxford, England.

He is a fellow of the American Association for the Advancement of Science and of the Biophysical Society, and was elected to the National Academy of Sciences in 1997. He is a member of the American Society of Biochemistry and Molecular Biology, Sigma Xi, American Chemical Society, New York Academy of Sciences, RNA Society and the Connecticut Academy of Science and Engineering. He has served on numerous advisory committees for the Department of Energy, Brookhaven National Laboratory, and the National Research Council. He was chairman of the Department of Chemistry at Yale from 1987-1990. He is a past Editor of the Biophysical Journal.

Career summary
 1961, B.S. Yale University
 1966, Ph.D. Harvard University
 1966-67, Postdoctoral Fellow, Institute de Biologie Moleculaire at University of Geneva in Geneva, Switzerland
 1967-69, Laboratory of Molecular Biology at the MRC in Cambridge, UK
 1969 Joined Yale Faculty
 1979-80, Guggenheim Fellow, University of Oxford, UK
 1992, American Association for the Advancement of Science Fellow
 1997, Member of National Academy of Sciences
 2001, Rosenstiel Award recipient
 2002, AAAS Newcomb Cleveland Prize recipient
 2003, American Academy of Arts and Sciences fellow

External links
Moore Lab Homepage
Peter Moore Profile at Yale University

21st-century American biologists
Members of the United States National Academy of Sciences
21st-century American chemists
Yale Department of Molecular Biophysics & Biochemistry faculty
Yale College alumni
Harvard University alumni
Academic staff of the University of Geneva
1939 births
Living people
Yale Sterling Professors
Milton Academy alumni
Presidents of the Biophysical Society